Barnstable is a 1963 Australian television play which had been performed on British TV. It was filmed in Melbourne. Sandra Power was the barrell girl from In Melbourne Tonight making her acting debut.

Cast
John Morgan (Charles Carboy)
Elizabeth Wing (Daphne, his wife)
Felicity Young (Helen Carboy)
Michael Duffield (the Rev. Wandsworth Tester)
Sandra Power (Sandra, a maid).

Production
The play had been performed on British radio in 1959 and British television in 1962. William Sterling called it "a comic modern parable of serious intention. In content, it reflects the thinking of many intellectual writers in Europe."

Reception
The TV critic for the Sydney Morning Herald wrote that "Blessed simplicity is the virtue of a parable, but in this production, strongly reminiscent in style of the first episode of a very dull science fiction serial, it was never clear whether the author... wanted an undercurrent of humour to his horror or an undercurrent of horror to his humour."

The Age wrote "it was difficult to known how to take the play."

References

External links

Australian television films
1963 television plays
Films directed by William Sterling (director)